Colin Herbert Bain Finlayson (January 24, 1903 – March 11, 1955) was a Canadian rower who competed in the 1924 Summer Olympics. In 1924 he won the silver medal as crew member of the Canadian boat in the coxless fours event. He died in Kemano, British Columbia.

The IOC medal database credits this medal to A. Mariacher. Also the official report shows Mariacher as competitor instead of Finlayson. The National Olympic Committee of Canada, however, shows only Finlayson as competitor, but not Mariacher. Also other contemporary sources give Finlayson instead of Mariarcher.

References

External links
Colin Finlayson's profile at databaseOlympics
Colin Finlayson's profile at Sports Reference.com

1903 births
1955 deaths
Canadian male rowers
Olympic rowers of Canada
Olympic silver medalists for Canada
Rowers at the 1924 Summer Olympics
Olympic medalists in rowing
Medalists at the 1924 Summer Olympics